Bokolobo is a village located in the Central African Republic prefecture of Ouaka.

History 
Bokolobo used to be headquarters of the UPC rebel group. On 12 and 13 January 2019, Portuguese paratroopers raided the UPC base in Bokolobo, seizing a number of weapons and destroying some checkpoints. On 8 March 2021, it was captured by government forces.

References 

Populated places in Ouaka